Matt Bouza (born April 8, 1958) is a former professional American football player who played wide receiver for eight seasons for the Baltimore/Indianapolis Colts.

Bouza graduated from Jesuit High School in Carmichael.

References

1958 births
Living people
Players of American football from San Jose, California
American football wide receivers
California Golden Bears football players
San Francisco 49ers players
Baltimore Colts players
Indianapolis Colts players